The 2002 Algarve Cup was the ninth edition of the Algarve Cup, an invitational women's football tournament hosted annually by Portugal. It was held from first to seventh of March 2002. This was the first edition where the tournament was expanded to twelve teams; all prior editions had eight teams participation. The tournament was won by China, defeating Norway 2-0 in the final-game. Sweden ended up third defeating Germany, 2-1, in the third prize game.

Format 
The twelve invited teams are split into three groups that played a round-robin tournament.

With 12 teams participating, the Algarve Cup format has been as follows: Groups A and B, containing the strongest ranked teams, are the only ones in contention to win the title. The group A and B winners contest the final - to win the Algarve Cup. The runners-up play for third place, and those that finish third in the groups play for fifth place. The teams in Group C played for places 7–12. The winner of Group C played the team that finished fourth in Group A or B (whichever has the better record) for seventh place. The Group C runner-up played the team who finishes last in Group A or B (with the worse record) for ninth place. The third and fourth-placed teams in Group C played for the eleventh place.

Points awarded in the group stage followed the standard formula of three points for a win, one point for a draw and zero points for a loss. In the case of two teams being tied on the same number of points in a group, their head-to-head result determined the higher place.

Participating teams

Group stage

Group A

Group B

Group C

Placement play-offs

Eleventh place match

Ninth place match

Seventh place match

Fifth place match

Third place match

Final

Final standings

Goal scorers

References

External links 
 Algarve Cup on WomensSoccerUnited.com
 RSSSF.com history page, with links to full results

2002
2002 in women's association football
Alg
March 2002 sports events in Europe
2002 in Portuguese women's sport